Super Nada is a 2012 Brazilian-Mexican comedy-drama film directed by Rubens Rewald.

The film features the musician Jair Rodrigues in its cast. For his participation in the film, Jair Rodrigues received the Special Award at the Festival do Rio. The actor Marat Descartes was also praised for his work in the role of Guto, the protagonist, having received the best actor award at the Festival de Gramado.

Plot
The film follows the story of Guto, an actor who lives in São Paulo and dreams to become a great actor. He prepares, practicing, and going to all auditions, believing that his big chance may come anytime. His greatest idol is Zeca, an old comedian, somewhat decadent, but that still inspires a generation. Their paths are crossed and the luck starts to change for Guto.

References

External links
  
 

2012 films
Films shot in São Paulo
Brazilian comedy-drama films
2012 comedy-drama films
Mexican comedy-drama films
2010s Mexican films